The 44M Tas was a Hungarian medium tank, in earlier Hungarian knowledge classified as a heavy tank design of World War II. It was developed to combat heavily armored Soviet tanks encountered on the Eastern Front and to replace the older Turán I and Turán II tanks which Hungary operated, modernising Hungary's armoured forces. The Tas somewhat resembled the German Panther tank in terms of both looks and capabilities. It was to be well armored – up to 120 mm thick and with sloped armor. The main armament would likely have been a Hungarian built heavily modified anti-tank version of the 80 mm Bofors AA gun. The only prototypes built were destroyed when the Americans bombed the Weiss Manfréd factory in July 1944.

Development and Design

History 
In 1943 Hungary had already realized that its tank production was obsolete and struggled against Soviet tanks. To solve the problem Hungary started to develop the Turán III and Zrínyi assault guns. However, it still tried to buy the license of foreign vehicles, the Panzerkampfwagen IV Ausführung H and the Panzerkampfwagen V "Panther" to be exact, but Germany rigidly refused to sell the blueprints. Hungary had no other option but to design its own modern heavy tank. In April 1943 the Ministry of Defense (HM) charged the Manfred Weiss factory to design the vehicle.

In the same year, a group of military experts of the Institute of Military Technology of the Hungarian Army (HTI) traveled to Kummersdorf, Germany where they saw the famous Tiger and Panther tanks. Unfortunately for the Hungarians, the tanks were not shown to them from the inside. However, because they were the only Hungarians who saw the modern German vehicles from up close in the given year, 3 HTI specialist officers took part in the designing procedures from the beginning.

The blueprints with all necessary data and budget plans were finished on 3 December 1943. Photos of the 1:10 scale metal mockup of the new vehicle were given to the HTI on 6 December 1943. The vehicle looked very similar to the German Panther but the designers used the steep slope angle of the Soviet T-34's frontal armor. The new heavy tank was named Tas in honor of one of the Seven Chieftains of the Magyars (Hungarians), the HM accepted the plans, development and production started in May 1944.

Construction of the prototype vehicle progressed slowly because it was the first entirely domestic tank project of Hungary so it was still in its infancy. The engineers constantly discovered newer and newer problems which needed solutions. Furthermore, the tank had welded armor which was a new method for the engineers. The Toldi light tanks had welded armor too but that tank had very thin armor plates. The Tas had 75 and 120 mm thick armor plates which proved to be a challenge for the engineers. Constant material shortages and Allied bombing raids did not help either.

The chassis of the Tas' iron made sample vehicle was ready in June 1944 with fully operational suspensions and built-in engines, and the turret's construction readiness came to a raw binding state. However, on 27 July 1944 an Allied bombing raid seriously damaged the Manfred Weiss factory. The production hall where the Tas was made collapsed and the sample vehicle completely burned out. Hungary tried to restart the project at Ganz factory but it didn't have enough time to actually start the re-building of the prototype. Not much progress was made on restarting the Tas project before the Soviets would invade Hungary and political turmoil involving the German occupation of Hungary and the installation of a puppet government would crush all hope to finish the project.

Suspension, Engine and Mobility 
The suspension of the Tas was a native design and it used 3 two wheel bogies with leaf springs and shock absorbers. It would have 6 medium sized road wheels, a drive wheel at the front and an idler wheel at the rear, with 5 return rollers above the road wheels. The same setup would be found on the other side. This would likely result in a smooth ride for the vehicle and its crew and a more stable platform for firing on the move.

When it came to propulsion, Hungary didn’t have many engines to choose from. Building a new V12 engine for the tank, with at least 700 hp, was originally considered but unlike with more industrialised powers, this option was not very likely for Hungary as it would have taken too much time, resources and capacity, to design and build a powerful new engine. Instead, it was decided that the Tas would be powered by two Weiss Manfréd Z-V8H-4 gasoline 8 cylinder engines from the Turán I/II (as both used the same engine). Each engine provided 260 hp (195 kW) for a total of 520 hp (390 kW). This choice had the benefits of using already tested engines in production and there were available spare parts for this engine, unlike with a new engine, which would also take a long time to develop, switch to producing and would not be compatible with other Hungarian tanks.

However, for a tank that would weigh 38 tonnes, 520 hp would result in only a little over 13.68 hp/tonne, which is somewhat underpowered. It was estimated this would give the Tas a top speed of 45 km/h and an operational range of 200 km. The actual mobility of the Tas may have been a little worse though, as when using two engines together to power one gearbox, some power is usually lost. Although it is still possible that the Tas could achieve these figures.

Armor, Hull and Turret Design 
The hull of the Tas looked similar to that of the Panther’s hull, but with notable differences such as a frontal mid plate and angled corners joining the upper front plate to the upper sides of the hull. A drawing of the hull armor thicknesses survived and according to it, the front of the hull of the Tas would have a heavily sloped 75 mm thick upper front plate, a 100/120 mm thick mid plate at a slight slope and a heavily sloped 75 mm thick lower plate. The Tas had sloped, angled corners of the upper front plate, but their thicknesses are unknown, although some estimate them to be 50 mm. The sides of the hull were protected by 50 mm of sloped armor above the tracks and 50 mm vertical armor behind the tracks. The upper section of the rear of the hull would be 100 mm thick with a slight slope and the lower section of the rear would be 50/75 mm at a decent slope. The belly and deck (underside and top of the hull) were 20 mm thick. 

Many sources list the maximum armor thickness as 120 mm so this seems to be the correct thickness for the mid front plate and it may have been increased from the original 100 mm or there may be contradicting information. The hull was welded, which combined with its thick armor meant the vehicle would have good protection, comparable to that of the German Panther. 

Not as much is known about the turret armor as mostly only written documents survived. However the rough armor thickness seems to be 100 mm all around, with possibly 50 mm at the rear of the turret rather than 100 mm. It is possible that the front of the turret would be 200 mm thick in total as the mantlet thickness is said to be 100 mm thick as well. The turret had a somewhat octagonal shape with a large, wide and curved gun mantlet, like that of the Panther A/D, but a bit larger. On top of the turret was a cupola with a hatch for the commander and another hatch for the gunner.

Armament

According to the original plans and the 1:10 scale mockup the Tas would have an 80 mm gun. In 1943 when the blueprints were made Hungary had only one such gun, the 80 mm 29/38.M Bofors AA cannon. We don't know if the conversion of the gun from an AA cannon to a tank gun actually started but we do know that there was a converted tank gun prototype of the same gun which was made in 1942. Perhaps the engineers planned to use that or waited for an actual converted tank gun.

The main armament of the Tas was the 80 mm (3.15 in) 29/44M L/58 gun. Developed by DIMÁVAG, it was a heavily modified, license produced version of the Bofors 80 mm anti-aircraft gun which the Hungarians used as the 80 mm 29/38M L/48 anti-air gun. The Tas' 1:10 scale mockup was modelled with the 29/44M L/58 gun. The first prototype of the 29/44M gun was ready in October 1943 but its first firing trials pointed out some serious flaws. Due to this, it was estimated that the mass production of this gun could not start earlier than the summer of 1944, therefore a temporary armament for the Tas prototypes had to be chosen. This is why the designers decided to use a 75 mm gun – the 7.5 cm 43.M tank gun for the prototypes. This is the same 75 mm gun which was used in the Turán III and the Zrínyi I. The 7.5 cm 43.M gun already had 2 finished models so the production of the gun would go more smoothly than waiting for the 80 mm tank gun to be produced. With the 75 mm cannon, the finished sample vehicle made of iron could be tested in the field and later could be easily modified to build in the 80 mm gun which was predicted to be ready by the time a serial vehicle made of armor plates would be finished.

Both guns had gun depression and elevation angles of -9° and +20° respectively.

However, due to material shortage, the third 75 mm gun was never finished by the time the Tas prototypes were destroyed by Allied bombing and the DIMÁVAG factory which produced the gun was later captured by the Soviets.

The 7.5 cm 43.M tank gun was powerful enough to reliably destroy most Soviet tanks from range such as the T-34, T-34/85, KV-1s and Soviet Tank destroyers, but would likely have struggled against the thick armor of the newest Soviet heavy tank on the front – the IS-2. It could still penetrate the lower front plate and the sides of the IS-2 from medium range. As for the planned 80 mm tank gun, it would have likely performed better than the 75 mm gun, as the Hungarians wouldn't have bothered trying to make it the main armament of the Tas, if it wouldn't be an improvement over the 75 mm gun.

Confusion, Mistakes and the 44M Tas Rohamlöveg (Tas assault gun)
During his research in the 1980s, Hungarian historian Pál Korbuly found sources mentioning the production of Tas chassis components in pairs, and he let his imagination run wild and thought that one vehicle was meant to be a tank destroyer version and even made a sketch about it according to his imagination. The characteristics of this fictional vehicle were the subject of speculation and it was referred to as the 44M Tas Rohamlöveg (Tas assault gun). The existence of this project was accepted as fact by many people. However, in the 2000s information was found explaining that the second Tas chassis was to be another regular Tas tank, instead of a tank destroyer variant. According to the surviving documents which were discovered, the Manfred Weiss factory undertook the production of 2 vehicles – one prototype made of iron as a sample vehicle on which further developments could be carried out more easily, and one prototype made of actual armor plates. This showed that both vehicles were going to be 44M Tas tanks and not tank destroyers. But because the 44M Tas Rohamlöveg was said to be a real project before this discovery, many people still think that the Tas tank destroyer was an actual project and fictional characteristics have even been made for it, even though no documents or blueprints were found of a Tas tank destroyer variant, and despite other researchers already stating that this was just a mistake. Even Korbuly later told a historical themed magazine that the Tas tank destroyer was completely his own idea which was based on the WW2 habit of turning every successful tank into a tank destroyer version.

There is no evidence of a Tas tank destroyer project ever existing.

Another mistake that many people make is that they think the 75 mm gun was a KwK 42. Hungary never had the license of the KwK 42 and did not have any, furthermore, Germany never gave any KwK 42 tank guns to Hungary. The 75 mm gun that was to be mounted on the Tas was simply a tank gun variant of the Hungarian license built Pak 40 (and not the KwK 40) which was called 7.5 cm 43.M anti-tank gun, the tank gun variant being the 7.5 cm 43.M tank gun.

See also 

Similar tanks
 43M Turán III
 A41 Centurion Mk 1
 IS-1 & IS-2
 M26 Pershing
 P43 tank
 Panther tank
 T-34/85
 Tiger I

Notes

References

External links 
 44M. Tas – TANK ENCYCLOPEDIA website 

Tanks of Hungary
World War II heavy tanks
Armoured fighting vehicles of Hungary
World War II medium tanks